Anthony Rowland Buck (born 18 August 1944) is an English former professional footballer who played as a striker.

Career
Born in Clowne, Buck played for Eastbourne Town, Oxford United, Newport County, Rochdale, Bradford City, Northampton Town and Bedford Town.

He was with Bradford City from January 1972 to February 1972, on loan from Rochdale, making 3 appearances in the Football League for them.

Sources

References

1944 births
Living people
English footballers
Eastbourne Town F.C. players
Oxford United F.C. players
Newport County A.F.C. players
Rochdale A.F.C. players
Bradford City A.F.C. players
Northampton Town F.C. players
Bedford Town F.C. players
English Football League players
Association football forwards